Lake Killian or Spring Lake is a small kettle lake wholly encompassed by Ma-Ka-Ja-Wan Scout Reservation in Pearson, Wisconsin.  It is a central geographic feature of the camp, dividing it into East Camp and West Camp on opposing sides of the lake. Both East Camp and West Camp maintain aquatics facilities where campers can complete various merit badges. The lake is used by scouts on both sides of the lake for fishing, swimming, and boating. Spring Lake Road, which goes through the scout reservation, is named for the lake.

Hydrology
Lake Killian receives all of its water from springs and precipitation; the only outflow is Skid's Creek on the west side of the lake. Skid's Creek drains from so far north in the lake that water in the southern basin has a significantly greater residence time than more northern waters.

Bathymetry
The bathymetric character of Lake Killian is dominated by a shallow northern third, with depths under 3 metres. The lake steadily deepens moving toward its center, with a deep central basin of 5 metres' depth or deeper occupying the central third. The southern and eastern portions of the lake are generally deeper than the northern and western regions. A large sandbar, less than a metre under the surface and stretching a hundred metres from end to end, dominates the southwestern extremity of the lake and is surrounded by comparatively shallow waters.

References

External links
 Ma-Ka-Ja-Wan Scout Reservation

Geography of Langlade County, Wisconsin
Killian
Kettle lakes in the United States